Zephyra is a genus of cormous plants in the  Tecophilaeaceae, first described as a genus in 1832. It is endemic to the Republic of Chile in South America.

Species
 Zephyra compacta C.Ehrh. - Atacama, Coquimbo
 Zephyra elegans D.Don - Coquimbo

References

External links

Asparagales genera
Endemic flora of Chile